The Alice C Plantation House, also known simply as the Alice Plantation House, is a historic former plantation house, located in the city of Franklin in St. Mary Parish, Louisiana.

History 
The Alice C Plantation House was designed mainly in the Greek Revival architecture style, with French Creole influences, and built using brick, weatherboard made of cypress, and an asphalt tile roof. The house is two and half stories tall and was made with "briquette entre poteaux" (a French Creole architecture term for brick infill between the framing). 

The home was initially built for Jotham Hulbert Bedell (1807–1859), who ran a sugar plantation and a sugar mill on the property. The sugar mill was removed in the 1950s. The subsequent owner of the home was, Alice and John Calder.

The home was featured in the film, Easy Rider (1969).

See also 
 List of plantations in Louisiana
 National Register of Historic Places listings in St. Mary Parish, Louisiana

References 

Sugar plantations in Louisiana
National Register of Historic Places in St. Mary Parish, Louisiana
Houses completed in 1850
1850 establishments in Louisiana
Houses in St. Mary Parish, Louisiana